Stephen Andrew Hero (born December 19, 1969) is a Canadian Catholic bishop.

Hero was born on December 19, 1969, in Montreal, Quebec. He carried out his philosophical studies at the Seminary of Christ the King in Mission, British Columbia from 1991 to 1994. He then studied theology at Saint Joseph Seminary in Edmonton from 1994 to 1997, and subsequently at the Pontifical Academy of Saint Thomas Aquinas in Rome from 1997 to 2000, where he earned a licentiate in spiritual theology.

He was ordained June 29, 2000 as a priest of the Archdiocese of Edmonton, Alberta, Canada.  After several years of parish ministry and service as the Director of Vocations, he earned a second licentiate in liturgical studies from the Pontifical Liturgical Institute at Sant'Anselmo in 2005. Hero was appointed to the formation team at St. Joseph Seminary in Edmonton and began teaching at Newman Theological College. He served at Rector of the seminary for nine years until his nomination as Bishop of the Diocese of Prince Albert, Saskatchewan. He was ordained Bishop on June 11, 2021, the Solemnity of the Sacred Heart of Jesus, which is the patronal feast of that diocese and its cathedral.

Arms

References

External links

1969 births
Living people
Clergy from Montreal
Catholic Church in Alberta
Pontifical North American College alumni
21st-century Roman Catholic bishops in Canada
Bishops appointed by Pope Francis
Roman Catholic bishops of Prince Albert